Kamencové jezero (Alum Lake) is a lake in the municipal area of Chomutov, Czech Republic. It is artificial in that it came into being due to 18th century mining.

It occupies an area of 15.95 ha and the maximum depth is 3.4 m.

The high content (about 1%) of alum in the water from Alum Lake prevents the lake from the growth of weed and anabaena. For that reason it is very frequently visited in the summer months.

References

Artificial lakes of the Czech Republic
Geography of the Ústí nad Labem Region
Chomutov